Ferrari 412T refers to two Formula One cars developed by Ferrari:
 Ferrari 412 T1 refers to the car used by Scuderia Ferrari in the 1994 Formula One season.
 Ferrari 412 T2 refers to the car used by Scuderia Ferrari in the 1995 Formula One season.

412T